Cape Sverre is a peninsula in Qikiqtaaluk Region, Nunavut, Canada. Named in  honor of Sverre Hassel of the 1900 Otto Sverdrup expedition, it is the northernmost point on Amund Ringnes Island.

References
 Atlas of Canada

Peninsulas of Qikiqtaaluk Region
Sverdrup Islands